Pertti "Lunkka" Lundell (born 12 August 1952) is a Finnish football manager. He is currently working as a youth coach for a Finnish club Musan Salama.

Lundell has been coaching 11 seasons in the Finnish premier divisions Mestaruussarja and Veikkausliiga. He's been nominated twice as the Finnish Football Manager of the Year. On his player career Lundell played for Pori-based clubs in the lower divisions.

Honors 
Club honors
Finnish Championship: 1994
Personal honors
Finnish Football Manager of the Year: 1983, 1994

References 

1952 births
Finnish footballers
Finnish football managers
FC Jazz managers
FC Inter Turku managers
Sportspeople from Pori
Living people
Ässät football players 

Association footballers not categorized by position
Musan Salama players